Vlčany is a village and municipality in Šaľa District, in the Nitra Region of south-west Slovakia.

Geography
The village lies at an altitude of 112 metres and covers an area of 39.764 km².

History
In historical records the village was first mentioned in 1113. After the Austro-Hungarian army disintegrated in November 1918, Czechoslovak troops occupied the area, later acknowledged internationally by the Treaty of Trianon. Between 1938 and 1945 Vlčany once more  became part of Miklós Horthy's Hungary through the First Vienna Award. From 1945 until the Velvet Divorce, it was part of Czechoslovakia. Since then it has been part of Slovakia.

Population
It has a population of about 3460 people. The town is about 72% Magyar, 26% Slovak and 2% Romany.

Government
The town has its own birth registry office and police force covering the municipality.

Facilities
The town has a public library, a gymnasium and a football pitch. It also has a DVD rental store, a cinema, and a pharmacy.

References

External links
http://www.statistics.sk/mosmis/eng/run.html

Villages and municipalities in Šaľa District
Hungarian communities in Slovakia